Nathan Clarke (born 30 November 1983) is an English former footballer professional footballer who played as a centre-back.

In a career that last from 2001 until 2021 Clarke represented Huddersfield Town, Colchester United, Oldham Athletic, Bury, Leyton Orient, Bradford City, Coventry City, Grimsby Town and FC Halifax Town.

Playing career

Huddersfield Town
Clarke is a product of the Huddersfield Town Academy. He began his first team career at the age of just 17 when his debut came in a 1–1 draw away to Stoke City on 8 September 2001. He scored his first goal for his home club on his home debut in the game in which ended in a 4–2 loss against Blackpool. He made a total of 37 starts in all competitions during the 2001–02 season his first as a professional with the first team with 36 of them coming in the league scoring once.

Clarke was runner-up in the Huddersfield Town 'Player of the Year' 2005–06 and was made vice-captain of the team aged just 21, going on to win the title the following year along with winning the 'players player award'. Clarke played under eight different managers at the Galpharm and was in the starting 11 for each one.

Clarke has been selected in FourFourTwo's Top 50 Football League Players at 43 in March 2006, down from 40 in the list in March 2005.

On 27 January 2011, after failing to break into Lee Clark's team, Clarke joined League One club Colchester United on loan until the end of the season. He made 18 appearances for the U's.

On 19 August 2011, he joined Oldham Athletic on a five-month loan deal. He made his debut the following day, where he also scored the first goal. Clarke returned to his parent club Huddersfield Town after making 16 appearances for Oldham. He then on 9 March, joined Bury on loan for the remainder of the season. He played a huge part in the club's league survival in the league, with them finishing mid table.

He left Huddersfield Town in June 2012 after playing over 300 games for his home town club (and almost 20 years at the club he has supported since he was a boy), 11 of those as pro.

Leyton Orient
Clarke signed for Leyton Orient on 18 July 2012 on a two-year contract. Boss Russell Slade made him the club captain of the London side within a week of being signed. On 14 February 2014, he signed a contract extension at Leyton Orient. He scored his first goal for the club on 11 March 2014 in the 2–0 win at Port Vale, a header at the near post from a corner. Two games later, Clarke scored an equalising goal in the 1–1 draw at Walsall, a deflected half-volley long-range shot in the 77th minute. Clarke was part of the team that played in the 2014 Football League One play-off final against Rotherham United, the game finishing 2–2 Orient lost 3–4 in a penalty shoot out.

On 24 July 2015, Clarke left the club in order to be closer to his family.

Bradford City
Clarke joined Bradford City on 28 July 2015 on a one-year contract.

Coventry City
Clarke joined Coventry City on 1 January 2017 as one of three new signings made by new Sky Blues manager Russell Slade, who had previously been his boss at Leyton Orient. He made his debut for the club the following day in the 2–2 draw at home to Bolton Wanderers. Clarke was cup-tied in the 2016–17 EFL Trophy due to playing for Bradford earlier in the season, his team went on to winning the 2017 EFL Trophy Final.

After making 18 appearances for Coventry in the 2016–17 season he was released by the club on 2 May 2017.

Grimsby Town
On 23 June 2017, Clarke signed a one-year contract with League Two side Grimsby Town on a free transfer. He scored his first goal for Grimsby on his debut in a 3–1 win over Chesterfield on 5 August 2017. He was released by Grimsby at the end of the 2017–18 season.

FC Halifax Town
On 3 August 2018, Clarke signed for his home town side FC Halifax Town following a trial spell during pre-season. He was made caretaker manager alongside Steve Nichol following the resignation of Jamie Fullarton on 15 July 2019. Clarke announced his retirement from professional football at the end of the 2020–21 season.

Personal life
Clarke has a younger brother, defender/midfielder Tom Clarke who plays for League One club Fleetwood Town.

Career statistics

Club

Honours

Player
Huddersfield Town
Third Division play-offs: 2003–04

Coventry City
EFL Trophy: 2016–17

References

External links

1983 births
Living people
Footballers from Halifax, West Yorkshire
English footballers
Association football defenders
Huddersfield Town A.F.C. players
Colchester United F.C. players
Oldham Athletic A.F.C. players
Bury F.C. players
Leyton Orient F.C. players
Bradford City A.F.C. players
Coventry City F.C. players
English Football League players
Grimsby Town F.C. players
FC Halifax Town players